The 1816 United States presidential election in Tennessee took place as part of the 1816 United States presidential election. Voters chose eight representatives, or electors to the Electoral College, who voted for President and Vice President.

Tennessee voted for the Democratic-Republican candidate, James Monroe, over the Federalist candidate, Rufus King.

See also 
 List of United States presidential elections in Tennessee

References

1816 United States presidential election by state
United States presidential elections in Tennessee